SMS Grosser Kurfürst may refer to one of two vessels of the Imperial German Navy:

 , commissioned in 1875, one of Germany's first armored ships to be built in Germany.
 , commissioned in 1914, a battleship which served during World War I.

See also
 , an ocean liner for North German Lloyd launched in 1899
 Frederick William, Elector of Brandenburg (1620–1688), the Great Elector, the namesake for these ships

German Navy ship names